The Ludwig Anderson Three-Decker is a historic triple decker house in Worcester, Massachusetts.  Built c. 1896, it was a good example of a vernacular Italianate triple decker, whose exterior decoration has since been removed or covered over.  It was listed on the National Register of Historic Places in 1990.

Description and history
The Ludwig Anderson Three-Decker is located on Vernon Hill south of downtown Worcester, at the western corner of Fairbanks and Stockton Streets.  It is a three-story wood-frame structure, with a shallow hip roof.  Its main facade is three bays wide, with the main entrance in the rightmost bay, sheltered by a gabled portico with round columns.  The interior follows a typical side hall plan, with a stairwell on the right providing access to the building's three units. Its historic exterior features have been compromised by the application of synthetic siding.  These features included a modillioned cornice, window surrounds with rope moulding on the caps, and an early 20th-century portico with paired square columns. 

The house was built about 1896, and was typical of early triple-deckers built to house workers in the factories of South Worcester and Quinsigamond Village.  Its first owners, and a number of its early tenants, were Swedish immigrants.  Ludwig Anderson, whose family owned it into the 1930s, was a grocer who also lived here, while early tenants were machinists, factory workers, and others engaged in lower-paid jobs.

See also
National Register of Historic Places listings in eastern Worcester, Massachusetts

References

Apartment buildings in Worcester, Massachusetts
Apartment buildings on the National Register of Historic Places in Massachusetts
Italianate architecture in Massachusetts
Houses completed in 1896
National Register of Historic Places in Worcester, Massachusetts